Brendan Michael Donovan (born January 16, 1997) is a German–born American professional baseball utility player for the St. Louis Cardinals of Major League Baseball (MLB).

Born in Würzburg, Germany, and raised in Enterprise, Alabama, Donovan played college baseball at the University of South Alabama before the Cardinals selected him in the seventh round of the 2018 MLB draft. He was a part of their minor league system before making his MLB debut in 2022, becoming a consistent member of their lineup as a utility player. Following the conclusion of his rookie season, he was named the first ever recipient of the National League Gold Glove Award for a utility player and was also a finalist for National League Rookie of the Year.

Amateur career
Donovan attended and played baseball at Enterprise High School in Enterprise, Alabama, where he hit .467 with four home runs, 44 RBIs, 17 doubles, and six triples as a senior in 2015. He played college baseball at the University of South Alabama. In 2017, he played collegiate summer baseball with the Hyannis Harbor Hawks of the Cape Cod Baseball League. In 2018, his junior year, he batted .302 with five home runs and 55 RBIs over 57 games. At the end of the season, he was selected by the St. Louis Cardinals in the seventh round of the 2018 Major League Baseball draft.

Professional career

Minor leagues
Donovan signed with St. Louis and made his professional debut with the State College Spikes of the Class A Short Season New York–Penn League, playing in four games. He spent most of the 2019 season with the Peoria Chiefs of the Class A Midwest League and played in one game with the Memphis Redbirds of the Class AAA Pacific Coast League, batting .268 with eight home runs and 53 RBIs over 114 games for the season. He did not play for a minor league team during the 2020 season, which was cancelled due to the COVID-19 pandemic. He started 2021 with Peoria (now members of the High-A Central) before being promoted to the Springfield Cardinals of the Double-A Central in early June and to Memphis (now members of the Triple-A East) in mid-August. Over 108 games between the three teams, he slashed .304/.399/.455 with 12 home runs and 66 RBIs. Donovan was selected to play in the Arizona Fall League for the Glendale Desert Dogs after the season where he was named to the Fall Stars Game. He was selected to the 40-man roster after the season on November 19, 2021. Donovan returned to Memphis to begin the 2022 season.

Major leagues
On April 25, 2022, Donovan was promoted to the major leagues. He made his MLB debut that night against the New York Mets as a pinch runner and scored on a single by Tyler O'Neill. The next night, Donovan made his first major league start; he went 0-for-2 and was hit by a pitch in a 0–3 loss to the Mets. On April 28, 2022, Donovan recorded his first career hit: a pinch-hit single against fellow rookie Tyler Holton of the Arizona Diamondbacks. On May 10, he hit his first MLB home run, off Dillon Tate of the Baltimore Orioles. 

Donovan finished his rookie season batting .281/.394/.379 with five home runs, 45 RBIs, and 21 doubles over 126 games. Defensively, he played left field, right field, first base, second base, shortstop, and third base, and was named the first ever recipient of the National League Gold Glove Award for a utility player. He was named a finalist for the National League Rookie of the Year Award, alongside Michael Harris II and Spencer Strider.

Personal life
Donovan was born in Würzburg, Germany, when his father was stationed overseas, and represented the Germany national baseball team in the 2021 World Baseball Classic.

Donovan is a Christian.

References

External links

1997 births
Living people
Baseball players from Alabama
Major League Baseball players from Germany
Major League Baseball infielders
St. Louis Cardinals players
Gold Glove Award winners
South Alabama Jaguars baseball players
Hyannis Harbor Hawks players
Peoria Chiefs players
State College Spikes players
Springfield Cardinals players
Memphis Redbirds players
Glendale Desert Dogs players